Military history of South Africa